The Royal Palace (official name Haw Kham) in Luang Prabang, Laos, was built in 1904 during the French colonial era for King Sisavang Vong and his family. The site for the palace was chosen so that official visitors to Luang Prabang could disembark from their river voyages directly below the palace and be received there. After the death of King Sisavang Vong, the Crown Prince Savang Vatthana and his family were the last to occupy the grounds. In 1975, the monarchy was overthrown by the communists and the royal family were taken to re-education camps. The palace was then converted into a national museum.

The Grounds

On the palace grounds, there are other buildings surrounding the palace which includes:
Kitchen/Storage
Royal Barge Shelter
Conference Hall
Haw Pha Bang
Staff Headquarters

There is a lotus pond and two cannons at the entrance of the palace. A statue of King Sisavang Vong is outside the conference hall.

Architecture and furnishings
The architecture of the palace has a mixed of traditional Lao motifs and French Beaux Arts styles. It was laid out in a double-cruciform shape with the entrance on one side of the lower crossbar. Above the entrance is a three-headed elephant sheltered by the sacred white parasol, the symbol of the Lao monarchy. The steps to the entrance are made of Italian marble. There are royal religious objects on display in the large Entrance Hall.

On the right of the entrance is the King's reception room, where busts of the Luang Phrabang and, later, Lao monarchs are displayed along with two large gilded and lacquered Ramayana screens, crafted by the local artisan Thit Tanh. The walls are covered with murals that depict scenes from traditional Lao lifestyles, painted in 1930 by a French artist, Alix de Fauntereau. Each of the walls is intended to be viewed at a different time of day, depending on the light that enters the windows on one side of the room, which matches the time of day depicted.

In the right front corner room of the palace, which opens to the outside, is a collection of the palace's most prized art, including the Phra Bang, cast of a gold, silver and bronze alloy. This Buddha stands 83 cm tall and weighs around 50 kg. Legend has it that the statue was made around the 1st century in Sri Lanka and was later gifted by the Khmer king to his son-in-law : King Fa Ngum in 1359.

The Siamese twice took the image to Thailand in 1779 and 1827, but it was returned to Laos by King Mongkut in 1867. There are rumours that the one on display is a copy and the original is stored in Vientiane or Moscow. It is said the real one had gold leaf over the eyes and a hole drilled through one of its ankle. Also in the room are another Buddha, engraved with large elephant tusks, and three beautiful saew mâi khán (embroidered silk screens with religious imagery) that were crafted by the Queen.

On the left of the Entrance Hall, the secretary's reception room is filled with paintings, silver and china that have been presented to Laos as diplomatic gifts from Myanmar, Cambodia, Thailand, Poland, Hungary, Russia, Japan, Vietnam, China, Nepal, United States, Canada and Australia. These objects are grouped by "socialist" and "capitalist" countries. One exhibit donated by the USA is a piece of moon rock obtained by an Apollo mission.

The next room to the left was once the Queen's reception room. Large royal portraits of King Savang Vatthana, Queen Khamphoui and Crown Prince Vong Savang, painted by Russian artist Ilya Glazunov in 1967, are hung on the walls. There are friendship flags from China and Vietnam and replicas of sculpture from the National Museum, New Delhi.

In the far rooms are the royal family's bedrooms and living quarters. The bedrooms have been preserved as they were in 1975 when the King was forced from the palace. There is a dining hall and a room that contains royal seals and medals.

The Throne Room contains the Crown Jewels of Laos.

Gallery

Literature

External links

 Photos of Luang Prabang's Royal Palace Museum
 Asia for Visitors information
 Lao Embassy in Washington D.C. | National Museum

Palaces in Laos
Royal residences in Laos
Museums in Laos
History museums
Buildings and structures in Luang Prabang